Lawndale may refer to:

Places
In the United States
Lawndale, California, a city in Los Angeles County
Lawndale, San Mateo County, California, former name of the town of Colma
 In Florida
Lawndale, the name for the H. S. Williams House
In Illinois
Lawndale, Logan County, Illinois, an unincorporated community
Lawndale Township, McLean County, Illinois
Several places in Chicago, Illinois
North Lawndale, Chicago
South Lawndale, Chicago
In Michigan
Lawndale, Kalamazoo County, Michigan, an unincorporated community in Comstock Township
Lawndale, Saginaw County, Michigan, an unincorporated community in Saginaw Charter Township
Lawndale, North Carolina, a town in Cleveland County
Lawndale, Philadelphia, Pennsylvania, a neighborhood in northeast Philadelphia

In fiction
Lawndale (Daria), the fictional setting for the MTV cartoon series Daria

Music
Lawndale (band), an instrumental surf rock band on SST Records

See also
West Vernor-Lawndale Historic District in Detroit, Michigan